Herman Clark Stadium Paul Galvan Field is a 12,000-capacity multi-use stadium in Fort Worth, Texas. The stadium is mostly used for High school football where it hosts teams from the Fort Worth Independent School District but is also used for track & field contests and soccer matches. The playing surface is artificial turf and there is no video scoreboard. Built in 1970 adjacent to Tarrant County College-South Campus, the stadium is named for Herman E. Clark, a longtime Fort Worth ISD athletic director. The field is named for Paul Galvan.

In February 2021, the parking lots of the stadium were used to stage a drive-through COVID-19 vaccination site.

References

External links
 Information at Texas Bob - Football stadiums

Sports venues completed in 1970
American football venues in the Dallas–Fort Worth metroplex
Athletics (track and field) venues in Texas
Soccer venues in Texas
High school football venues in Texas
Sports venues in Fort Worth, Texas
Fort Worth Independent School District